The Blue Banana also known as the European Megalopolis or the Liverpool–Milan Axis, is a discontinuous corridor of urbanization in Western and Central Europe, with a population of around 100 million. The conceptualisation of the area as a "Blue Banana" was developed in 1989 by RECLUS, a group of French geographers managed by Roger Brunet.

It stretches approximately from North West England through the English Midlands across Greater London to the European Metropolis of Lille, the Benelux states with the Dutch Randstad and Brussels and along the German Rhineland, Southern Germany, Alsace-Moselle in France in the west and Switzerland (Basel and Zürich) to Northern Italy (Milan, Turin, and Genoa) in the south.

History

The French geographer Roger Brunet, who observed a division between "active" and "passive" spaces, developed the concept of a West European "backbone" in 1989. He made reference to an urban corridor of industry and services stretching from northern England to northern Italy. The color blue referred to either the flag of the European Community, or the blue collars of factory workers in the region.

Brunet saw the "European Backbone" as the development of historical precedents, e.g. trade routes, or as the consequence of an accumulation of industrial capital. In his analysis Brunet excluded the Paris urban area and other French conurbations because of French economic insularity. His aim was a greater economic integration in Europe, but he felt that France had lost this connection by the 17th century as a result of its persecution of Huguenots and centralisation in Paris. Later versions do, however, include Paris.

In 1991, in the context of a study on behalf of the European Commission in support of its Regional Policy, researchers criticized the idea of the Blue Banana as a desirable formation, but not an empirical reality, identifying it as the result of regional competition in Europe. Furthermore, their diagram of the Blue Banana had more of a curve, still including Northern Italy, but ending at Barcelona. It also included Paris, and had the Anglo-Scottish border as its northern stem. A study of the history of the Blue Banana as a concept refers to the commission's study as a mistaken rejection of the Blue Banana from Brunet's original conception. From the research on the commission's behalf, the Blue Banana represented a developed core at the expense of the periphery, whereas Brunet empirically viewed the Blue Banana as a region of development at Paris's periphery, beyond the French borders. There are also considerations for an economically strong European pentagon with its borders Paris, London, Hamburg, Munich and Milan, with development axes towards the east (Berlin, Prague, Trieste).

In the Italian media, the opinion was put forward that, according to EU data from 2013, the shape of the blue banana should be changed because Italian territory had lost its connection due to increasing de-industrialization. Only Lombardy could "keep up". In contrast, there are new economic development lines in Veneto, Friuli-Venezia Giulia and Slovenia through the connecting points of the maritime Silk Road. In particular, the port of Trieste, next to Gioia Tauro, the only deep-water port in the central Mediterranean for container ships of the seventh generation, is therefore particularly the target of investments. Transport via Trieste instead of northern ports such as Rotterdam and Hamburg shortens the delivery time from Shanghai by ten days and from Hong Kong by nine days, which significantly reduces transport costs and  emissions.

Shift of the Blue Banana 
In recent years, the Blue Banana has been shifting north towards Germany, as industrialization draws in new populations towards the Northern European countries. Rapid urbanization led to an increase in slums and poverty stricken areas, which pushed European countries to implement new policies regarding urban renewal. Since the United Kingdom’s Action for Cities, France’s Reconquête Urbaine and Germany’s Städtebauförderung have been put in place, these urbanization policies have built a stronger foundation and better utilized urban spaces. These policies allow countries to expand further, economically, just as Germany has done.

If current trends of urbanization continue, 72% of the world's population will live in cities by 2050. This creates the need for the preparation of European countries to improve themselves to deal with the capacity of people that will move into the cities. Since the rapid increase of urbanization and more people moving to cities, the banana is growing instead of shifting.

Due to urbanization, the Blue Banana has become larger in size, branching outwards in a star shape. Despite this, the Blue Banana still remains the core of the conurbation. Although the Blue Banana may not have the same formation it had decades ago, it still holds Europe’s largest gathering of people, industry, money, and economic power.

See also

Belt and Road Initiative
Demographics of Europe
Four Motors for Europe
Golden Banana
List of metropolitan areas in the European Union by GDP
Northeast megalopolis – a similar region in the United States
Middle Francia
History of Burgundy
Kingdom of Burgundy
Burgundian Circle
Spanish Road

References

Sources

Economic regions of Europe
Demographics of Europe
Geographical neologisms
Metropolitan areas of the European Union
Urban studies and planning terminology